Pyramidelloidea is a superfamily of mostly very small sea snails, marine gastropod mollusks and micromollusks within the clade Panpulmonata.

This is a voluminous taxon: above the species level close to 400 named taxa are referred to this gastropod superfamily.

Pyramidelloidea has both fossil and recent members. They live as ectoparasites on bivalve molluscs and polychaete worms, and have a sharp, piercing stylet instead of a radula.

Distribution
This taxon is found worldwide.

Taxonomy

1999 taxonomy 
Taxonomy by Schander, Van Aartsen & Corgan (1999):

Superfamily Pyramidelloidea Gray, 1840
Family Amathinidae Ponder, 1987
Family Ebalidae Warén, 1994 - synonym: Anisocyclidae van Aartsen, 1995
Family Odostomiidae Pelseneer, 1928
Subfamily Odostomiinae Pelseneer, 1928
Subfamily Chrysallidinae Saurin, 1958
Subfamily Odostomellinae Saurin, 1958
Subfamily Cyclostremellinae Moore, 1966
Family Pyramidellidae J. E. Gray, 1840
Subfamily Pyramidellinae J.E. Gray, 1840
Subfamily Sayellinae Wise, 1996
Family Syrnolidae Saurin, 1958
Subfamily Syrnolinae Saurin, 1958
Subfamily Tiberiinae Saurin, 1958
Family Turbonillidae Bronn, 1849
Subfamily Turbonillinae Bronn, 1849
Subfamily Eulimellinae Saurin, 1958
Subfamily Cingulininae Saurin, 1959

2005 taxonomy 
Pyramidelloidea has been classified within the informal group Lower Heterobranchia in the taxonomy of Bouchet & Rocroi (2005).

Taxonomy of Bouchet & Rocroi, 2005:
Superfamily Pyramidelloidea
Family Pyramidellidae
Family Amathinidae
 † Family Heteroneritidae
Family Murchisonellidae

2010 taxonomy 
Jörger et al. (2010) have redefined major groups within the Heterobranchia and they moved Pyramidelloidea to Panpulmonata.

Pyramidelloidean genera of uncertain familial position 
 Bidentata de Castellanos, 1982
 Calyptopolyptychia Gougerot, 1968
 Laeviselica Gougerot & Le Renard, 1977
 Lysacme Dall & Bartsch, 1904
 Microthyca A. Adams, 1863
 Oopyramis Thiele, 1930
 Sulcorinella Dall & Bartsch, 1904

References 

Panpulmonata
Ectoparasites
Marine gastropods
Taxa named by John Edward Gray